

This is a list of the National Register of Historic Places listings in Caddo Parish, Louisiana.

This is intended to be a complete list of the properties and districts on the National Register of Historic Places in Caddo Parish, Louisiana, United States.  The locations of National Register properties and districts for which the latitude and longitude coordinates are included below, may be seen in a map.

There are 68 properties and districts listed on the National Register in the parish, including 2 National Historic Landmarks.  Three properties were once listed, but have since been removed.  One listing, the Caddo Parish Confederate Monument, was originally listed in Caddo Parish but has since been relocated to De Soto Parish.

Current listings

|}

Former listings

|}

See also

List of National Historic Landmarks in Louisiana
National Register of Historic Places listings in Louisiana

References

Caddo Parish